Shunsuke (written: , , , , , , , , ,  or ) is a masculine Japanese given name. Notable people with the name include:

, Japanese footballer
, Japanese volleyball player
, Japanese actor, talent and fashion model
, Japanese baseball player
, Japanese footballer
, Japanese football player
, Japanese rower
, Japanese actor and model
, Japanese volleyball player
, Japanese baseball player
, Japanese swimmer
, Japanese footballer
, Japanese diver
, Japanese rower
, Japanese voice actor, actor and singer
, Japanese composer
, Japanese footballer
, Japanese pop singer
, Japanese cross-country skier
, Japanese government official
, Japanese footballer
, Japanese painter
, Japanese idol, singer and actor
, Japanese rower
, Japanese physician
, Japanese footballer
, Japanese politician
, Japanese footballer
, Japanese footballer
, Japanese actor
, Japanese rugby union player
, Japanese footballer
, Japanese footballer
, Japanese actor and voice actor
, Japanese classical violinist and violist
, Japanese actor and voice actor
, Japanese golfer
, Japanese footballer
, Japanese voice actor
, Japanese historian and philosopher
, Japanese footballer
, Japanese footballer
, Japanese baseball player
, Japanese badminton player

See also
Shinsuke Nakamura (born 1980), a Japanese professional wrestler
29986 Shunsuke, a minor planet named after the footballer Shunsuke Nakamura

Japanese masculine given names